Salcombe Preparatory School is a co-educational preparatory school for approximately 200 pupils, located in Southgate, London, England.  The school is currently owned and operated by Cognita. Founded in 1916, Salcombe is a co-educational preparatory day school for children aged between 3 and 11. The school is located in Chase Side, Southgate, and Green Road, Oakwood, both in North London. The Green Road site is Grade II listed with Historic England.

History
Salcombe Preparatory School first opened in 1916 under the leadership of the Deakin sisters: Miss Freda Deakin and Miss Ethel Deakin in Hornsey. The school initially educated eight "well to do" children.

In 1917, with World War I ongoing, and the advent of Zeppelin raids, it was decided that the school could not operate in Hornsey and the Deakin sisters took the students to their country residence, Salcombe House, in Devon.  In 1918, upon returning to London, the sisters relocated their school to Avenue Road in Southgate close to the current site on Chase Side.

Between 1977 and 1990, the school was run by Ms. Flood and her husband Mr Ernest Lawn. The school was acquired by Asquith Court group in 1990 and the first headmaster was appointed - Mr. Anthony Blackhurst.

In 1998, the school needed to expand and the Green Road site was acquired for the lower years. The Green Road building is Grade II listed with Historic England.

Heads
Miss Ethel Deakin (1916–75)
Mr & Mrs Ernest Lawn (1977–90)
Mr Anthony Blackhurst (1990–2001)
Mr Ari Guha (2001-2005)
Mr Floyd Steadman (2006-2008)
Mr Berni Curzon (2008-2009)
Mrs Christina Leach (2009-2013)
 Mrs Sarah-Jane Davies (2013–2021)
Miss Nicola Sands (2021–present)

Notable former pupils
Karren Brady, sporting executive & television broadcaster
 Sir Robert Winston, professor, medical doctor, scientist, television presenter and politician
Maro Itoje, England international rugby player
Ross McWhirter, co-founder of Guinness World Records
Norris McWhirter, co-founder of Guinness World Records

See also
 De Bohun Primary School in Green Road

References

External links

Profile on Cognita website

1916 establishments in England
Educational institutions established in 1916
Cognita
Former library buildings in England
Grade II listed buildings in the London Borough of Enfield
Grade II listed educational buildings
Private co-educational schools in London
Private schools in the London Borough of Enfield
Modernist architecture in London
Oakwood, London
Preparatory schools in London
Southgate, London